The Happy Hocky Family! is a children's book by author and illustrator Lane Smith.  Written in a style similar to the Dick and Jane books, it tells a series of short, typically single page, stories about the Hocky family, which includes the two parents, three children, their dog, and occasionally their cousin.

About The Book
The book is not a typical picture book in that the humor in it tends to be slightly dark and sarcastic, as in the works of Jon Scieszka.

Sequel
A sequel, The Happy Hocky Family Moves to the Country!, was released in 2002.

References

External links
Lane Smith's Website

American picture books
Children's short story collections
1993 children's books